Buddy Bonnecaze is an American poker player, winner of two World Series of Poker bracelets in the 1990s. Bonnecaze was a prominent player in the 1980s and 1990s.

Bonnecaze began cashing in poker tournaments in the mid-1980s and made his first cash in the World Series of Poker in 1986, finishing in 35th place in the Main Event, winning $7,500.

He won his first WSOP bracelet in 1992 in the $1,500 Pot Limit Hold'em event.  The next year, Bonnecaze won another bracelet, this time in the $1,500 Pot Limit Omaha event.

After nearly a decade away from the poker scene, Bonnecaze returned to tournaments and came close to winning the Winter Bayou Poker Challenge $300 No Limit Hold'em tournament in New Orleans in 2009, finishing in 4th place and earning a $4,609 pay day.

As of 2009, Bonnecaze has tournament winnings of $234,064, with $205,465 of those winnings from the WSOP.

World Series of Poker Bracelets

External links
Hendon Mob profile  
WSOP profile

Notes

American poker players
World Series of Poker bracelet winners
Living people
Year of birth missing (living people)
Place of birth missing (living people)